Lightship 2000 was a restored old red lightvessel with a cafe and chapel on board situated in Cardiff Bay. During the redevelopment of Cardiff Bay, the Cardiff Bay Development Corporation called together the churches in Cardiff to discuss the role of Christianity in the Bay. Lightship 2000 was the result of these discussions.

History
The ship was launched in 1953 and from that year until 1989 it was a working lightvessel in a number of locations around the UK, ending its working life off Rhossili on the Gower Peninsula to warn of the Helwick Swatch, a treacherous sandbank. It was purchased in 1993 and refurbished as a floating Christian centre.

The ship closed in 2013 and in May 2015 it left Cardiff. It was planned to restore the ship, and for it to become a floating museum at Newnham on Severn.

Chaplains
Rev'd Monica Mills, a United Reformed Church minister, served as chaplain of Cardiff Bay until early 2010. Mills died on 1 December 2010.

The Rev'd Peter Noble, former Moderator of Synod of the United Reformed Church Wales, took over the post of chaplain in March 2012 and since the closure of the ship has continued to serve as chaplain to Cardiff Bay.

References

External links 
 
 

Landmarks in Cardiff
Churches in Cardiff
1953 ships
Lightships of the United Kingdom
Ships and vessels on the National Register of Historic Vessels
Museum ships in the United Kingdom